Dániel Sváb (born 2 September 1990 in Salgótarján) is a Hungarian football player.

Career

He played his first league match in 2011.

On 22 August 2013, it was officially announced that Sváb signed for Energie Cottbus with a contract until 2015. He left Cottbus at the end of the 2013–14 season after they were relegated from the 2. Bundesliga.

Career statistics

Honours
Ferencváros
Hungarian League Cup (1): 2012–13

References

External links
 

1990 births
Living people
People from Salgótarján
Hungarian footballers
Association football defenders
Ferencvárosi TC footballers
FC Energie Cottbus players
Győri ETO FC players
Mezőkövesdi SE footballers
Nemzeti Bajnokság I players
Szigetszentmiklósi TK footballers
Karmiotissa FC players
2. Bundesliga players
Cypriot First Division players
Hungarian expatriate footballers
Expatriate footballers in Germany
Hungarian expatriate sportspeople in Germany
Hungarian expatriate sportspeople in Cyprus
Sportspeople from Nógrád County